Global Gaming was a Swedish gaming company which had offices in Malmö, Tallinn and Malta.

History and licensing
Global Gaming was founded in 2009 was the inventor of PaynPlay system and the famous Ninja Casino brand. PaynPlay allows players to deposit and play with online gaming operators via third party registration, as the KYC process it outsourced to, predominantley, banks.

In October 2017, Global Gaming went public through an IPO at Nasdaq First North.

In Q1 2018, Global Gaming reported a 266% increase in revenue to SEK198.6m (£16.9m), including a 451% increase for Ninja Casino from last year's revenue.

In July 2018, Global Gaming secured a license to operate in Estonia's regulated market, with the EMTA granting Global Gaming a license for Ninja Casino after giving their seal of approval to the company's PayNPlay service.

In September 2020, the Baltic gaming giant Enlabs announced a public bid at Global Gaming, and in November 2020 Enlabs informed they have reached ownership above 96% of the shares, and by that delisted Global Gaming, which operations there after was overtaken and incorporated in Enlabs, and by that Global Gaming ceased to exist.

Awards
 2017 eGaming Review (EGR) Nordic Awards: In-house innovation
 2017 eGaming Review (EGR) Operator, Marketing & Innovation Awards: Innovative start-up
 2018 eGaming Review (EGR) Nordic Awards: Casino Operator, Marketing Campaign and Nordics Operator (Nominated)

Sponsorships
In June 2018, Global Gaming announced a sponsorship deal with Formula 1 celebrity driver Mika Salo to be the face of Ninja Casino in Finland. Including a wide range of initiatives – such as TV commercials, Meet and Greets, and competitions to win F1 trips – the campaign was slated to run through the entire summer 2018.

References

Gambling companies established in 2009
Companies based in Malmö
Online gambling companies of Sweden